Environmental communication is "the dissemination of information and the implementation of communication practices that are related to the environment. In the beginning, environmental communication was a narrow area of communication; however, nowadays, it is a broad field that includes research and practices regarding how different actors (e.g., institutions, states, people) interact with regard to topics related to the environment and how cultural products influence society toward environmental issues".

Environmental communication also includes human interactions with the environment. This includes a wide range of possible interactions, from interpersonal communication and virtual communities to participatory decision-making and environmental media coverage. From the perspective of practice, Alexander Flor defines environmental communication as the application of communication approaches, principles, strategies, and techniques to environmental management and protection.

History 
Environmental Communication, breaking off from traditional rhetorical theory, emerged in the United States around the 1980s. Researchers began studying environmental communication as a stand-alone theory because of the way environmental activists used images and wording to persuade their public's. Since then, environmental communication theory has reached multiple milestones including the creation of the journal of environmental communication in 2007.

In academia 
As an academic field, environmental communication emerged from interdisciplinary work involving communication, environmental studies, environmental science, risk analysis and management, sociology, and political ecology.

In his 2004 textbook, Alexander Flor considers environmental communication to be a significant element in the environmental sciences, which he believes to be transdisciplinary. He begins his textbook on environmental communication with a declarative statement: "Environmentalism as we know it today began with environmental communication. The environmental movement was ignited by a spark from a writer’s pen, or more specifically and accurately, Rachel Carson’s typewriter." According to Flor, environmental communication has six essentials: knowledge of ecological laws; sensitivity to the cultural dimension; ability to network effectively; efficiency in using media for social agenda setting; appreciation and practice of environmental ethics; and conflict resolution, mediation and arbitration. In an earlier book published in 1993, Flor and colleague Ely Gomez explore the development of an environmental communication curriculum from the perspectives of practitioners from the government, the private sector, and the academe.

The role of Environmental Communication in education and academia is centered around goals through pedagogy. These are aimed at trying to increase ecological wakefulness,  support a variety of practice-based ways of learning and building a relationship of being environmental change advocates.

In general, Environmental skepticism is an increasing challenge for environmental rhetoric.

Climate change communication

Information Technology and Environmental Communication 
The technological breakthroughs empowered by the appearance of the Internet are also contributing to environmental problems. Air pollution, acid rain, global warming, and the reduction of natural sources are also an outcome of online technologies. Netcraft argued that in the world, there are 7,290,968 web-facing computers, 214,036,874 unique domain names, and  1,838,596,056 websites leading to significant power consumption.  Therefore, notions such as “Green Websites” have emerged for helping to tackle this issue. “Green Websites” is “associated with the climate-friendly policies and aims to improve the natural habitat of Earth. Renewable sources, the use of black color, and the highlight of the environmental news are some of the easiest and cheapest ways to contribute positively to climate issues”. The aforementioned term is under the umbrella of “Green Computing,” which is aiming to limit the carbon footprints, energy consumption and benefit the computing performance.

Symbolic action 

Environmental communication is also a type of symbolic action that serves two functions: Environmental human communication is pragmatic because it helps individuals and organizations to accomplish goals and do things through communication. Examples include educating, alerting, persuading, and collaborating. Environmental human communication is constitutive because it helps shape human understanding of environmental issues, themselves, and nature. Examples include values, attitudes, and ideologies regarding nature and environmental issues.

In the book Pragmatic Environmentalism: Towards a Rhetoric of Eco-Justice, environmental philosopher Shane Ralston criticizes Cox's pragmatic function of environmental communication for being too shallow and instrumental, recommending instead a deeper account borrowed from Pragmatism: "[A]n even better way to move beyond a conception of pragmatic rhetoric as shallow instrumentalism and deepen the meaning of pragmatic[...] is to look instead to philosophical pragmatism’s other rich resources, for instance, to its fallibilism, experimentalism, and meliorism."

Environmental nature communication occurs when plants actually communicate within ecosystems: "A plant injured on one leaf by a nibbling insect can alert its other leaves to begin anticipatory defense responses." Furthermore, "plant biologists have discovered that when a leaf gets eaten, it warns other leaves by using some of the same signals as animals". The biologists are "starting to unravel a long-standing mystery about how different parts of a plant communicate with one another."

All beings are connected by the Systems Theory, which submits that one of the three critical functions of living systems is the exchange of information with its environment and with other living systems (the other two being the exchange of materials and the exchange of energy). Flor extends this argument, saying: "All living systems, from the simplest to the most complex, are equipped to perform these critical functions. They are called critical because they are necessary for the survival of the living system. Communication is nothing more than the exchange of information. Hence, at its broadest sense, environmental communication is necessary for the survival of every living system, be it an organism, an ecosystem, or (even) a social system."

Environmental Communication plays an integral role in sustainability science. By taking knowledge and putting it into action.  Since Environmental Communication is focused on everyday practices of speaking and collaborating, it has a deep understanding in the public discussion of environmental policy. Something that sustainability science has a shortcoming of.  Sustainability science requires cooperation between stakeholders and thus requires constructive communication between those stakeholders to create sustainable change.

Limitations of Environmental Communication 
Robert Cox is a leader in the discipline of environmental communication and its role in the public sphere. Cox covers the importance of Environmental Communication and the role it plays in policy-making processes, advocacy campaigns, journalism, and environmental movements.  Something that Cox overlooks in the importance of Environmental communication in the Public Sphere is the role visual and aural communication, electronic and digital media, and perhaps most glaringly, popular culture.

The field of Environmental Communication also faces challenges of being silenced and invalidated by governments. Environmental communication like many disciplines had challenges with people with opposing views points that make it difficult to spread a certain message. Environmental Communication like many highly polarized topics is prone to confirmation bias which makes it difficult to have compromises in the world of policy making for the environmental crisis.

Environmental Communication faces a variety of challenges in the political environment due to increased polarization. People often feel threatened by arguments that do not align with their beliefs (boomerang effect). These can lead to psychological reactance, counter-arguing, and anxiety. This can cause difficulty in making progress in political change regarding environmental issues.

Environmental Communication Theory 
To understand the ways in which environmental communication has an effect on individuals, researchers believe that one's view on the environment shapes their views in a variety of ways. The overall study of environmental communication consists of the idea that nature "speaks." In this field, theories exist in an effort to understand the basis of environmental communication.

Material-Symbolic Discourse 
Researchers view environmental communication as symbolic and material. They argue that the material world helps shape communication as communication helps shape the world. The word environment, a primary symbol in western culture, is used to shape cultural understandings of the material world. This understanding gives researchers the ability to study how cultures react to the environment around them.

Mediating-Human Nature Relations 
Humans react and form opinions based on the environment around them. Nature plays a role in human relations.  This theory strives to make a connection between human and nature relations. This belief is at the core of environmental communication because it seeks to understand how nature affects human behavior and identity. Researchers point out that there can be a connection made with this theory and phenomenology.

Applied Activist Theory 
It is difficult to avoid the "call to action" when talking about environmental communication because it is directly linked with issues such as climate change, endangered animals, and pollution. Scholars find it difficult to publish objective studies in this field. However, others argue that it is their ethical duty to inform the public on environmental change while providing solutions to these issues.

As the following section suggests, there are many divisions of studies and practices in the field of environmental communication, one of which being social marketing and advocacy campaigns. Though this is a broad topic, a key aspect of successful environmental campaigns is the language used in campaign material. Researchers have found that when individuals are concerned & interested about environmental actions, they take well to messages with assertive language; However, individuals who are less concerned & interested about environmental stances, are more receptive to less assertive messages. Although communications on environmental issues often aim to push into action consumers who already perceive the issue being promoted as important, it is important for such message producers to analyze their target audience and tailor messages accordingly.

Areas of study and practice 
According to J. Robert Cox, the field of environmental communication is composed of seven major areas of study and practice:

 Environmental rhetoric and discourse
 Media and environmental journalism
 Public participation in environmental decision making
 Social marketing and advocacy campaigns
 Environmental collaboration and conflict resolution
 Risk communication
 Representations of nature in popular culture and green marketing

Publications

Journals 
Peer-reviewed journals related to environmental communication include:

 Applied Environmental Education and Communication
 Environmental Communication

Books
 Anderson, Alison (1997). Media, Culture and the Environment. London: Routledge
 Anderson, Alison (2014). Media, Environment and the Network Society. Basingstoke: Palgrave
 Boykoff, Maxwell T (2019). Creative (Climate) Communications: Productive Pathways for Science, Policy and Society. London: Oxford University Press
 Corbett, Julia B (2006). Communicating Nature: How We Create and Understand Environmental Messages. Washington, D.C.: Island Press
 Cox, J. Robert (2010). Environmental Communication and the Public Sphere (2nd ed.). Thousand Oaks, CA: SAGE Publications
Fletcher, C Vail & Jeanette Lovejoy (2018) Natural Disasters and Risk Communication: Implications of the Cascadia Subduction Zone Megaquake. Maryland: Lexington Books
 Flor, Alexander G (2004). Environmental Communication: Principles, Approaches and Strategies of Communication Applied to Environmental Management. Diliman, Quezon City, Philippines: University of the Philippines Open University
Mathur, Piyush (2017). Technological Forms and Ecological Communication: A Theoretical Heuristic. Lanham, Maryland: Lexington Books
Ralston, Shane (2013). Pragmatic Environmentalism: Towards a Rhetoric of Eco-Justice. Leicester: Troubador.
Stephens, Murdoch (2018). Critical Environmental Communication: How Does Critique Respond to the Urgency of Climate Change. Maryland: Lexington Books

See also 
 Climate emergency declaration (includes usage of the term "climate emergency")
 Climate crisis (about usage of the term)
 Communication studies
 List of environmental issues
 List of environmental studies topics
 Lists of environmental publications
Media coverage of climate change
Science Communication Observatory

References

Further reading

External links
 International Environmental Communication Association (IECA) – a professional association for environmental communication practitioners, teachers, and scholars
 ClimateClock: clock counting down to 1,5°C temperature rise
Lexington book series on Environmental Communication and Nature: Conflict and Ecoculture in the Anthropocene
 Talk.Eco: Resources for Environmental Communicators – a website featuring curated resources for environmental communication professionals
 Environmental Communication: What it is and Why it Matters by Mark Meisner
 Environmental Communication: Research Into Practice – an online course
 Bibliography of books in environmental communication by Mark Meisner
 ECOresearch Network – Research Network on Environmental Online Communication
 Indications: Environmental Communication blog (inactive), 2010–2012
About the Environmental Communication Division – The International Communication Association Environmental Communication Division
 Communication et environnement, le pacte impossible by Thierry Libaert

 
Interdisciplinary subfields of sociology
Communication studies